Ann Marie Bollin (born August 18, 1960) is an American politician in Michigan. Bollin is a member of the Michigan House of Representatives from District 49.

Education 
Bollin attended Central Michigan University. Bollin was a Taubman Fellow of Senior Executives and Local Government at Harvard University's Kennedy School of Government.

Career 
Bollin had served on Brighton Township’s Planning Commission. In 2003, Bollin became a clerk for Brighton Township until 2018.

On November 6, 2018, Bollin was elected to the Michigan House of Representatives for District 42. Shortly afterwards, Bollin was named to serve on the Republican Party Policy Action Plan Committee.

On November 13, 2020, it was reported that Bollin had tested positive for COVID-19. On November 16, 2020, Bollin reiterated her opposition to a mandatory mask order in Michigan while at home recovering from the virus.

In 2022, after redistricting, Bolin was elected to represent the 49th state House district.

Personal life 
Bollin's husband is Tim. They have three sons. Bollin and her family live in Brighton Township, Michigan.

References

External links 
 Ann Bollin at ballotpedia.org
 Ann Bollin at votesmart.org
 Ann Bollin at michiganvotes.org
 Ann Bollin at ourcampaigns.com
 Bollin on issues at livingstondaily.com

Living people
1960 births
21st-century American politicians
21st-century American women politicians
People from Livingston County, Michigan
Republican Party members of the Michigan House of Representatives
Women state legislators in Michigan